Jair Marinho de Oliveira (17 July 1936 – 7 March 2020), known as Jair Marinho, was a Brazilian footballer who played as a defender.

He earned four caps for the Brazil national team. He was part of the 1962 FIFA World Cup winning squad, but he did not play any matches during the tournament.

Marinho died on 7 March 2020, aged 83.

Honours
 Campeonato Carioca: 1959
 Torneio Rio – São Paulo: 1957, 1960
 Copa O'Higgins: 1961
 Copa Oswaldo Cruz: 1961
 World Cup winner: 1962

References

External links
 

1936 births
2020 deaths
Brazilian footballers
Association football defenders
Brazil international footballers
Afro-Brazilian sportspeople
1962 FIFA World Cup players
FIFA World Cup-winning players
Fluminense FC players
Sport Club Corinthians Paulista players
Associação Portuguesa de Desportos players
CR Vasco da Gama players
Sportspeople from Rio de Janeiro (state)